Janosik is a television series that aired in Poland in 1974. It is about a famous Goral outlaw (named after, but not actually the legendary Slovak Juraj Jánošík) who in folk legends steals money and goods from the rich and helps out the poor. The main hero was captured by Austrian soldiers and hanged on a hook by a rib.

The series was directed by Jerzy Passendorfer.

There are 13 1-hour episodes.

Cast
Janosik - Marek Perepeczko
Kwiczoł - Bogusz Bilewski
Maryna - Ewa Lemańska
Pyzdra - Witold Pyrkosz
Murgrabia - Marian Kociniak
Count Horvath - Mieczysław Czechowicz

References

External links

Polish drama television series